Corey Ollivierre (born 16 March 1997) is a Grenadian swimmer. He competed in the men's 100 metre breaststroke event at the 2016 Summer Olympics, where he ranked 46th with a time of 1:08.68. He did not advance to the semifinals. He also competed in three events at the 2018 Commonwealth Games.

References

External links
 

1997 births
Living people
Grenadian male swimmers
Olympic swimmers of Grenada
Swimmers at the 2016 Summer Olympics
Place of birth missing (living people)
Pan American Games competitors for Grenada
Swimmers at the 2015 Pan American Games
Commonwealth Games competitors for Grenada
Swimmers at the 2014 Commonwealth Games
Swimmers at the 2018 Commonwealth Games